Rammu is a village in Jõelähtme Parish, Harju County in Estonia. The village comprises Rammu island, Allu island and Malusi islands.

References

Villages in Harju County